Zawada is a Polish-language surname. Historically, due to the instability of the orthography, as well as in the periods of the partitions of Poland by foreign powers the same person or persons of the same family could use different spelling of the surname. Variant spellings include Zavada (Russified) and  Sawada/Sowada (Germanized). The Czech/Slovak cognate is Závada.

Notable people with this surname include:
 Andrzej Zawada (1928–2000), Polish mountain climber
 Clay Zavada (born 1984), American baseball player
 David Zawada (born 1990), German mixed martial artist
 Jan Zawada (born 1988), Czech footballer
 Oskar Zawada (born 1996), Polish footballer
 Robert Zawada (born 1944), Polish handball player
 Sławomir Zawada (born 1965), Polish weightlifter

See also
 
 Zawadzki
 Zawadowski
 Zawady (disambiguation), place names

Polish-language surnames